The ASUN Conference baseball tournament, sometimes referred to simply as the ASUN Tournament, is the conference baseball championship of the NCAA Division I ASUN Conference. Before the ASUN expanded to 12 members in 2021 (2022 season), the top six finishers in the regular season of the conference's teams advanced to the double-elimination tournament. The winner of the tournament receives an automatic berth to the NCAA Division I Baseball Championship.

Champions

By year
The following is a list of conference champions and sites listed by year.

By school
The following is a list of conference champions listed by school.

Italics indicate that the program is no longer an ASUN member.

References